James L. Foley Jr. (November 12, 1885 – ?) was an American politician and farmer.

Born in Wauwatosa, Wisconsin, Foley went to Marquette University and University of Wisconsin. He was a farmer. In 1935, Foley served in the Wisconsin State Assembly and was a Democrat.

Notes

1885 births
Year of death unknown
People from Wauwatosa, Wisconsin
Marquette University alumni
University of Wisconsin–Madison alumni
Farmers from Wisconsin
Democratic Party members of the Wisconsin State Assembly